Ini3 Digital is an online game service provider based in Thailand. Established in 2004, it is the first Thai company to utilize the Free-to-play model and the first to import Web-browser based games into the Thai game industry.

In 2005, Ini3 Digital started servicing Fly for Fun, a.k.a. Flyff, developed by Aeon Soft from South Korea. The slogan used for the game was “we want to see Thais fly” because Flyff is an MMORPG game where the in-game characters can fly. As the first service provider to use the “Free to Play” model, Ini3 also launched “Pangya” in the same year. Pangya is a Casual golf fantasy game, developed by Hanbitsoft from South Korea. 
From the success of servicing Pangya, Ini3 has launched more than 30 online games up to date with more than 17 million registered users.

Published Games

References

Entertainment companies of Thailand
Thai companies established in 2004